Live at Piedmont Park is a live album and video release by the Dave Matthews Band from a 2007 benefit concert in Atlanta.  The concert was held at Atlanta's Piedmont Park in front of an audience of over 80,000 people to raise over US $1 million of a  US $42.5 million project to expand  of the city's park.  Also performing that day were the Allman Brothers Band.  The performance featured guest appearances by Warren Haynes on "What Would You Say" and Gregg Allman on "Melissa."  The concert featured many old songs such as "Don't Drink the Water" and "Two Step", but also introduced the first released recordings of: "#27", "Cornbread", and "Eh Hee".

The concert was performed the day after band saxophonist Leroi Moore's 46th birthday.  Matthews, the band, and the audience serenade Moore with an apparently spontaneous rendition of "Happy Birthday to You" following the performance of "One Sweet World."

The concert is infamous for missing the backup vocals of drummer Carter Beauford throughout the whole show. Although Carter sang all of his parts, they are not heard on the recording or live DVD. Footage shows him singing in his mic, but no audio corresponds in the recording. This is likely due to an error in mixing.

CD track listing 
Disc 1:
"One Sweet World" (Mildred Hill/Patty Smith Hill/Dave Matthews)  – 9:02
"Two Step" (Matthews)  – 13:28
"Cornbread" (Mark Batson/Matthews)   – 5:06
"Don't Drink the Water" (Matthews)   – 12:23
"You Might Die Trying" (Batson/Matthews)   – 7:12
"Grey Street" (Matthews)   – 5:57
"#27" (Matthews)   – 5:42
"What Would You Say" (Matthews)  feat. Warren Haynes  – 8:16
"Melissa" (Gregg Allman)  feat. Gregg Allman  – 6:01
Disc 2:
"Louisiana Bayou" (Batson/Matthews)  – 8:07
"The Dreaming Tree" (Stefan Lessard/Matthews)   – 15:28
"Eh Hee" (Matthews)   – 4:55
"So Much to Say" (Peter Griesar/Matthews/Boyd Tinsley)   – 5:34
"Anyone Seen the Bridge?" (Dave Matthews Band)   – 1:59
"Too Much" (Dave Matthews Band)   – 6:24
"#40" (Matthews)   – 1:04
"Warehouse" (Matthews)   – 12:23
"Stay (Wasting Time)" (Matthews)   – 7:34
Encore CD:
"All Along the Watchtower" (Bob Dylan)  – 9:52
"Ants Marching" (Matthews)   – 8:14

DVD track listing 
Disc 1:
"One Sweet World"
"Two Step"
"Corn Bread"
"Don't Drink the Water"
"You Might Die Trying"
"Grey Street"
"#27"
"What Would You Say" feat. Warren Haynes
"Melissa" feat. Gregg Allman
"Louisiana Bayou"
"The Dreaming Tree"
"Eh Hee"
Disc 2:
"So Much to Say"
"Anyone Seen the Bridge?"
"Too Much"
"#40"
"Warehouse"
"Stay (Wasting Time)"
"All Along the Watchtower" (Bob Dylan)
"Ants Marching"
Credits

Personnel
Dave Matthews Band
Dave Matthews - guitars, lead vocals
Boyd Tinsley - violins, backing vocals
Leroi Moore - saxophones, backing vocals
Stefan Lessard - bass
Carter Beauford - drums, percussion, backing vocals
Guests
Gregg Allman - acoustic guitar, vocals
Warren Haynes - electric guitar
Butch Taylor - keyboards, backing vocals
Rashawn Ross - trumpet, backing vocals

References

Dave Matthews Band live albums
2007 live albums